In Chinese history, a Taishang Huang or Taishang Huangdi is an  honorific and institution of a retired emperor. The former emperor had, at least in name, abdicated in favor of someone else. Although no longer the reigning sovereign, there are instances where the retired emperor became a power behind the throne, often exerting more power than the reigning emperor.

History

Origin
The title Taishang Huangdi was first used when Qin Shi Huangdi posthumously bestowed it upon his deceased father, King Zhuangxiang.

Development
Emperor Gaozu of Han had also bestowed the title Taishang Huangdi on his then-living father Liu Taigong. He bestowed it onto his father to express filial piety. It was also intended to preserve the social hierarchy between father and son, as the former was a commoner and the latter was a dynastic founder.

In 301, during the War of the Eight Princes, Sima Lun became the emperor by forcing his puppet Emperor Hui of Jin to become the Taishang Huang. The title had strictly served as an honorific before, but it had become a tool of political infighting over the course of this incident.

Another significant occurrence of development was in 399, when Lü Guang of Later Liang abdicated. Lü Guang was old and had become mortally ill, but he wished to secure the transition of imperial power to his designated heir (the eldest son from his main consort) in the presence of another son who was older and posed a threat to the legitimate succession. Even though Lü Guang failed in his efforts, this incident was the earliest example where imperial retirement served as a method to secure succession.

During the Northern and Southern dynasties, this institution was employed by non-Han regimes in the north as a strategy to cast away from the tradition of the horizontal succession in favor of the Han tradition of a male primogenitor pattern of succession. In contrast, due to their Han heritage, the southern regimes had no need to make use and never employed the institution as a means to stabilize successions.

In 617, Li Yuan (later Emperor Gaozu of Tang) bestowed the title Taishang Huang upon Emperor Yang of Sui in absentia. Here, Li Yuan used the honorific as a legitimating cover for his seizure of power, in which the newly-installed Yang You served as his puppet emperor. In 626 during the Xuanwu Gate Incident, Prince Li Shimin of Tang led his armed men in a coup for the throne. During the course of the coup, he succeeded in killing his rival brothers, Crown Prince Li Jiancheng and Prince Li Yuanji. Within three days, Emperor Gaozu created Li Shimin as his heir. On the ninth day of the eighth month, Emperor Gaozu abdicated in favor for his son Li Shimin (who became Emperor Taizong). He remained as Taishang Huang until his death in 635.

Modern usage
In modern Chinese history after 1949, Deng Xiaoping has been called Taishang Huang in a pejorative context because he wielded much of his power without assuming the titles normally taken on by China's paramount leader, and because he belonged to Mao Zedong's generation of leaders but wielded influence over leaders who were a generation below him. The term has also been applied to other Communist Party senior officials without formal titles who were seen as meddling in the affairs of their successors, such as Chen Yun and Jiang Zemin.

List of Taishang Huangs
Instances of Chinese rulers who were granted the title Taishang Huang and/or Taishang Huangdi:
 Early eras
 King Zhuangxiang of Qin (281-247 BC). He was posthumously honored by his son, Qin Shi Huang.
 Liu Taigong (282-197 BC), the father of Emperor Gao (Liu Bang), the founder of the Han dynasty.
 Emperor Hui (259-307, r. 290-307) of the Jin dynasty
 Northern and Southern dynasties
 Lü Guang  (337-400, r. 386-400) of Later Liang, abdicated shortly before death
 Emperor Xianwen (454-476, r. 465-471) of Northern Wei
 Emperor Wucheng (537-569, r. 561-565) of Northern Qi
 Gao Wei (557-577, r. 565-577) of Northern Qi
 Emperor Xuan (559-580, r. 578–579) of Northern Zhou
 Sui and Tang dynasty rulers
 Emperor Yang (569-618, r. 604–618) of the Sui dynasty, who was proclaimed Taishang Huang while his grandson, Yang You, was nominally the emperor. He never personally accepted the title. He was the only Taishang Huang who was the grandfather – not the father – of the reigning emperor.
 Emperor Gaozu (566-635, r. 618–626) who was forced to abdicate in 626 and was made Taishang Huang until his death in 635.
 Wu Zetian (690–705). The only person in Chinese history to have been both Empress Dowager and Taishang Huang. She was buried in accordance to her wishes as an Empress Dowager and Empress Consort to Emperor Gaozong.
 Emperor Ruizong (684–690, 710–712), who abdicated in 712 and was made Taishang Huang until his death in 716.
 Emperor Xuanzong (712–756), who was forced to abdicate in 756 and was made Taishang Huang until his death in 762.
 Emperor Shunzong (761-806, r. 805), who abdicated in 805 and was made Taishang Huang until his death in 806, said to be assassinated by eunuchs.
 Emperor Zhaozong (888–904), who abdicated in 900 and was made Taishang Huang until his restoration in 901.
 Yan ruler
 An Lushan, who was assassinated in 757 by his son and successor An Qingxu, who claimed him to be severely ill and willing to abdicate, honored him Taishang Huang as if he was actually living.
 Min ruler
 Zhuo, who was honored Taishang Huang by his son Zhuo Yanming who was claimed emperor in April 945. In July both Zhuos were killed.
 Song dynasty rulers
 Emperor Huizong (1100–1126), who abdicated in 1126 and was taken into the Jin Dynasty in 1127, died in 1135.
 Emperor Gaozong (1127–1162), who abdicated in 1162 and was made Taishang Huang until his death in 1187.
 Emperor Xiaozong (1162–1189), who abdicated in 1189 and was made Taishang Huang until his death in 1194.
 Emperor Guangzong (1189–1194), who was forced to abdicate in 1194 and was made Taishang Huang until his death in 1200.
 Western Xia and Western Liao rulers
 Yelü Zhilugu of Western Liao, who was made Taishang Huang by his son-in-law Kuchlug after being overthrown by the latter
 Emperor Shenzong of Western Xia
 Later rulers
 Emperor Yingzong of Ming (1435–1449, 1457–1464) of the Ming dynasty was a Taishang Huang from his capture by the Mongols in 1449 until his return to the throne in 1457. He was the only Taishang Huang who was a brother of the reigning emperor.
 The Qianlong Emperor (1735–1796) of the Qing dynasty, who nominally abdicated and made himself Taishang Huang in 1796 but held on to power until his death in 1799.

 Vietnam
 Trần Thái Tổ of the Trần dynasty 
 Mạc Đăng Dung of the Mạc dynasty

See also
 Abdication
 Retired Emperor
 Daijō Tennō, the adaption of this concept in Japan
 Taesangwang, the adaption of this concept in Korea

References

Chinese royal titles
History of Imperial China
Retirement